The Lebanese Ice Hockey Federation is the governing body of ice hockey in Lebanon.

History
The federation was accepted into the International Ice Hockey Federation on September 26, 2019. It is an associate member of the IIHF, and therefore has no right to vote in the General Assembly. The current president of the federation is Charles El-Mir.

External links
 International Ice Hockey Federation

Ice hockey governing bodies in Asia